The Bad Boys of Bokaro Jail is the novel written by Chetan Mahajan and published by Penguin Random House in 2014.

Publication 
The Bad Boys of Bokaro Jail is written by author Chetan Mahajan. Spanning 216 pages, it was published by Penguin Random House in 2014.

Content 
Mahajan, author of the book, then working with Everonn, was accused of fraud and arrested in end of 2012. He was arrested among the peak of festive season, and thus he had to wait for more time to get his case come up for hearing and to get bail. During that period, he started writing the prison diary to record and analyse his experience being held in custody at Bokaro jail. The book is about unremarkable record of the days spent in the company of men who have been accused of petty or pernicious crimes.

Reception 
M.R. Narayan Swamy, writing for Free Press Journal, recommended the book to know more about Indian prisons. Somak Ghosal reviewed the work for Mint. According to him, Mahajan managed to convey the layers of complexity that lie beneath the surface of cases that may appear straightforward, without a shadow of doubt regarding the offender. He also wrote, "Mahajan’s account makes pertains to the troubled premises of the judiciary in India."

References 

2014 Indian novels
Novels set in India
Penguin Random House